The Edmonton Composting Facility was the site of the Canadian City of Edmonton's co-composting system for processing organic waste. Co-composting involves mixing household waste with biosolids (sewage sludge), and using microorganisms to break them down into simple compost. Waste was separated from general garbage.

In 2017 structural issues were identified in the roof of the aeration hall and by spring of 2019 conditions had deteriorated to the point that it was no longer safe to continue to operate the facility. The facility will be demolished and organic waste will be directed to the recently completed Anaerobic Digestion Facility.

Size
Built in 1999, the Edmonton Composting Facility was the largest of its kind in North America, both in volume and capacity. A replacement facility is in the works along with the now-functional Anaerobic Digestion Facility.

References

External links
City of Edmonton - Edmonton Composting Facility

Buildings and structures in Edmonton
Industrial composting
Sewage treatment plants in Canada
Water supply and sanitation in Canada
Municipal government buildings in Canada
Steel